Mahir Canova Stage is a theatre in Balgat neighborhood of Çankaya district in Ankara, Turkey. It is operated by the Turkish State Theatres. It is named in honor of theatre director Mahir Canova (1915–1993).

References

Theatres in Ankara
Çankaya, Ankara
Turkish State Theatres